Parts is the debut studio album by American band OHMME. It was released on August 24, 2018 through Joyful Noise Records.

Track listing

References

2018 debut albums
Joyful Noise Recordings albums
Ohmme albums
Experimental pop albums